Bosnia and Herzegovina competed at the 2018 European Athletics Championships in Berlin, Germany, from 6–12 August 2018. Bosnia and Herzegovina were represented by 6 athletes.

Results
 Men 
 Track and road

Field events

See also
Bosnia and Herzegovina at the 2018 European Championships

References

Nations at the 2018 European Athletics Championships
2018
European Athletics Championships